Surface force denoted fs is the force that acts across an internal or external surface element in a material body. Surface force can be decomposed into two perpendicular components: normal forces and shear forces. A normal force acts normally over an area and a shear force acts tangentially over an area.

Equations for surface force

Surface force due to pressure 
 , where f = force, p = pressure, and A = area on which a uniform pressure acts

Examples

Pressure related surface force 

See also 
Body force
Contact force

Classical mechanics
Fluid dynamics
Force